George O'Malley, M.D. is a fictional character from the medical drama television series Grey's Anatomy, which airs on the American Broadcasting Company (ABC) in the United States. The character was created by series producer Shonda Rhimes, and was portrayed by actor T. R. Knight from 2005 to 2009. Introduced as a surgical intern at the fictional Seattle Grace Hospital, O'Malley worked his way up to resident level, while his relationships with his colleagues Meredith Grey (Ellen Pompeo), Cristina Yang (Sandra Oh), Izzie Stevens (Katherine Heigl) and Alex Karev (Justin Chambers) formed a focal point of the series. O'Malley married Callie Torres (Sara Ramirez) from whom he later separated to pursue a relationship with Stevens. O'Malley also had entertained romantic interests with Grey and Olivia Harper (Sarah Utterback).

Knight auditioned for the show, expecting a 1-season run. In 2009, after the conclusion of the fifth season, it was confirmed that Knight would not be returning for the show's sixth season. The actor stated the reason for his departure was due to a "breakdown in communication" with Rhimes, his character's lack of screen-time, as well as his decision to come out as gay. Knight received positive reviews for his performance as O'Malley, and garnered a nomination for Outstanding Supporting Actor in a Drama Series at the 59th Primetime Emmy Awards. Despite this, his death received mixed feedback from critics and audiences.

Storylines 
George O'Malley is introduced as a fellow surgical intern along with Meredith Grey (Ellen Pompeo), Cristina Yang (Sandra Oh), Izzie Stevens (Katherine Heigl) and Alex Karev (Justin Chambers); the 5 of them working under Miranda Bailey (Chandra Wilson). O'Malley and Stevens move in with Meredith, for whom he has romantic feelings but did not express them due to his fear of rejection and the fact that she and one of the attendings Derek Shepherd (Patrick Dempsey) had a mutual interest in one another. On the first day of internship, O'Malley is selected by chief of cardiothoracic surgery Preston Burke (Isaiah Washington) as the first intern to perform surgery. He freezes in the operating room, and is mocked by his peers, and earns the nickname "007" because of almost killing a patient in such a simple operation (referring to James Bond's "license to kill"). O'Malley dates nurse Olivia Harper (Sarah Utterback), breaking up with her when he contracts syphilis from her, which she in turn contracted from Karev. His friendship with Karev is further strained when the two become trapped in an elevator with a patient who begins to bleed out. Karev freezes, and O'Malley is able to save the patient single-handedly. He finally admits his feelings to Meredith, and the two have a one-night stand. When Meredith tells him that sleeping together was a mistake, O'Malley begins avoiding her and starts dating orthopedic surgeon Callie Torres (Sara Ramirez).

During a camping trip, O'Malley learns that Torres has slept with chief of plastic surgery Mark Sloan (Eric Dane), and also discovers that Burke is experiencing tremors in his hand. When O'Malley's father is diagnosed with esophageal cancer and a leaking aortic valve, he refuses to allow Burke to operate on him, instead contacting Erica Hahn (Brooke Smith), Burke's medical school rival. His relationship with Torres is strained when he confronts her about sleeping with Sloan, but he allows her to support him through his father's deteriorating health. Complications from his father's surgery leave him in multi-system organ failure, and his life support is turned off. In an attempt to overcome his grief, O'Malley elopes with Callie to Las Vegas. He later begins to feel that he was mistaken to marry her, and sleeps with Stevens while intoxicated. Stevens confesses that she is in love with him, so O'Malley considers transferring to a different hospital so he can be faithful to his wife. However, he is ineligible to transfer after failing the intern exams. O'Malley decides to repeat his intern year, and confesses to Torres that he slept with Stevens, leading the two to separate. O'Malley and Stevens embark on a short-lived relationship, only to discover there is no real chemistry between them.

O'Malley moves in with new intern Lexie Grey (Chyler Leigh), Meredith's half-sister. Lexie and O'Malley discover that he failed his exam by only a single point, leading him to confront Richard Webber (James Pickens Jr.), the chief of surgery, to ask for a chance to retake the exam. He passes the second attempt, and begins to distance himself from Lexie, who has fallen in love with him. O'Malley supports Stevens when she discovers she has melanoma, and walks her down the aisle as she marries Karev. O'Malley begins to display a talent for trauma surgery, and is told by the chief of trauma surgery Owen Hunt (Kevin McKidd) that it is definitely his specialty. He then abruptly and inexplicably decides to join the U.S. Army in Iraq. While his friends at the hospital prepare an intervention to convince O'Malley to stay, they all work on a severely disfigured John Doe, brought in after a horrible bus accident, in which he pushed a woman out of the way and saved her life. John Doe writes on Meredith's hand "007" and she realizes it is actually George. She runs to tell the other surgeons and they rush him to surgery. However, he flatlines and is ultimately declared braindead. There is confusion on if John Doe is really George and Callie confirms by a freckle on his hand. His organs are donated after Stevens confirms that it is what O'Malley would have wanted, and he is buried a week later.

Development

Casting and creation

T. R. Knight signed on for the pilot as O'Malley, expecting that the role might be short-lived, because he liked that the character was multi-faceted. In October 2006, news reports surfaced that Washington had insulted Knight with a homophobic slur, during an argument with Patrick Dempsey. Shortly after, the details of the argument became public, and Knight later disclosed that the slur made him come out as gay. "I was under no delusions," Knight said at the time. "My friends on the set knew. We talked about it. Publicly it's not my thing to call up People magazine and be like, 'Hey, you want to know something about me?'...I could've just let it slide and not said anything, but it became important. It became important to make the statement." The situation seemed somewhat resolved when Washington issued a statement, apologizing for his "unfortunate use of words during the recent incident on-set". 

At the 64th Golden Globe Awards, while being interviewed on the red carpet, Washington joked, "I love gay. I wanted to be gay. Please let me be gay." Later, Washington claimed he never used the slur, labeling it "vile". In June 2007, it was reported that the American Broadcasting Company (ABC) and Shonda Rhimes had chosen not to renew Washington's contract with the show, not immediately specifying a reason. In a subsequent interview, Washington claimed that "they fired the wrong guy" (referring to Knight), and said he was considering filing a lawsuit as a result. He accused Knight of using the controversy to bolster his own career and increase his salary on Grey's Anatomy.

On July 2, 2007, Washington appeared on Larry King Live, to present his side of the controversy. According to Washington, he never used the "F-Word" in reference to Knight, but rather blurted it out in an unrelated context in the course of an argument "provoked" by Dempsey, who he felt was treating him like a "B-word", a "P-word", and the "F-word", which Washington said conveyed "somebody who is being weak and afraid to fight back". In 2009, Rhimes told Entertainment Weekly that she may not have handled the incident correctly, stating: "I wasn't interested in what anybody thought publicly. I was interested in what was going on right here on the ground...with the people I work with every day. Did I do it perfectly? Of course not. This is my first television show. It was a learning experience." Knight said that Rhimes was among those for discouraging him to come out, however Rhimes said: "I remember saying [to fellow executive producer], 'This is our proudest day here. T. R. got to come out and I got to say to him that it wouldn't affect his character' because he was concerned he was going to come out and George would suddenly be gay. The idea that a gay actor can't play a straight man is insulting."

In December 2008, reports speculated that Knight requested to be released from his contract and that "they were working out the details" at that time. In June 2009, after the conclusion of the fifth season of Grey's Anatomy, it was confirmed that Knight would not be returning for the show's sixth season. The actor stated the reason for his departure was due to a "breakdown in communication" with Rhimes, O'Malley's lack of screen-time, as well as his decision to be openly gay. Prior to the official announcement of his departure, there was speculation that the role of O'Malley would be recast, but Rhimes labeled it as a "hilarious, ridiculous rumor". After the confirmation of his exit, Knight told TV Guide: "Leaving Grey's Anatomy was not an easy decision for me to make. I am extremely grateful to have had the opportunity to play this character and will miss my fellow cast and crew very much. I continue to wish them the very best, and wholeheartedly thank all of the fans who have supported me and the show with such passion and enthusiasm." In a statement confirming Knight's departure, Rhimes said: "I think I speak for the entire Grey's Anatomy family when I say we wish T. R. Knight the best in his future endeavors. He is an incredibly talented actor and a person whose strength of character is admired by all of us."

In an interview with Entertainment Weekly, Rhimes said she tried to talk him out of quitting, explaining: "I looked in his face and he was really sure. It felt like the right thing for him." However, in another interview, Knight said of his exit: "My five-year experience proved to me that I could not trust any answer that was given [about O'Malley]." Knight was "at peace" with his departure, saying: "There just comes a time when it's so clear that moving on is the best decision." However, Heigl tried to talk Knight out of leaving, saying: "I didn't think it was the right decision. I felt like some of the problems could be worked through. But by the time it came to fruition, I was [glad] for him because he was ready to go." On the topic of losing a US$14 million contract, Knight commented: "From an outsider's perspective, I get the [impression that] 'He's just a spoiled actor, he doesn't know how good he has it.' There are a lot of people who would like to be in my position. But in the end, I need to be fulfilled in my work."

Characterization

O'Malley was characterized a "hapless naif". On the topic of O'Malley's longtime crush on Meredith in the second season, Knight said: "What's going to be very interesting to see is what he's going to do with Meredith. It's getting close to time. Whatever he chooses to do will inform who he is the rest of his life." After their sexual encounter occurred onscreen, Knight said in an interview with Maureen Ryan of the Chicago Tribune: "George wasn't really paying full attention. He was letting his own feelings override his respect for Meredith. A person really clued in would get that there wasn't anything coming back, but he was so in his head about it and caught up in his own feelings that he wasn't listening. It's not just that he loves her...it's a kind of selfish love he had for her." He also added that, "I think George has a lot of growing up to do. Part of that is making horrible, stupid mistakes. He's been pretty sheltered."

Series writer Stacy McKee said of the sexual encounter: "There's no turning back. There's nothing George and Meredith can do. The damage is done – things will never be the same. They've just changed something important in their lives forever." When asked if O'Malley was becoming more assertive, Knight said:

Knight also commented that the character does not appreciate himself and his positive traits. On the topic of O'Malley performing open heart surgery in an elevator, Knight said: "It's a slow change but he's starting to realize, 'The way I have been doing things is not working.' The big thing about the open-heart surgery in the elevator was he was forced into it. He needs to be kind of kicked in the (butt) to do these things."

Knight felt a parallel to George in that his "confidence isn't always at its absolute highest", but overall he sees more differences than similarities. However, when the actor starts to think he is so different from O'Malley, an awkward move can suggest otherwise. "I was walking, doing a scene with Katherine Heigl. I finished my line with her, and then I walked straight into the light stand." Critical of her affair with O'Malley, Knight's co-star Heigl explained: "They really hurt somebody, and they didn't seem to be taking a lot of responsibility for it. I have a really hard time with that kind of thing. I'm maybe a little too black and white about it." Speaking of O'Malley's relationship with Lexie, Rhimes offered her insight: "I love them as friends. They make good friends. We all have that friend we met in school or the gym or somewhere – we just hit it off right away. And right away there was no pretense or airs. Just pure honesty. That's Lexie and George. They're really good friends and I can see the friendship evolving into something even greater." When asked what his "favorite George moment" was, Knight said his relationships with Stevens and Bailey.

Reception

Fans were "widely against" O'Malley's affair with Meredith in the second season, however certain fans who supported their relationship were critical when Torres was introduced as a love-interest for him. Fans and critics were also against O'Malley's relationship with Stevens in the fourth season; Maclean's said: "George must die. He's slept with virtually everyone except the male cast and has been in love with virtually everyone except the male cast. And he's not that great of a doctor. Evolve or die." Christopher Monfette of IGN said O'Malley and Stevens were a "mismatch", adding: "Unfortunately, while it's refreshing to see a plotline driven by activity vs. apathy, the idea of these two ever-affable, best-friend characters suddenly discovering their potential, out-of-nowhere love for each other quickly feels both force-fed and emotionally-incorrect." Similarly, DVD Verdict stated that George and Izzie were "one of the strongest 'best-friend' vibes on television" for the first 3 seasons, explaining "they were perfect as friends [while] George and Callie made a good couple." UGO.com put the two on their list of "Character Couples Who Should Have Never Happened".

Jennifer Armstrong of Entertainment Weekly said that when O'Malley told Torres about his affair with Stevens, the scene was too "melodramatic". Laura Burrows, also of IGN, said that the fourth season premiere "introduced a new side of George". Armstrong said of O'Malley and Stevens' reconciliation: "George and Izzie are finally on the old Grey's Anatomy road to ruin. And I admit this is a good lesson in Grey's viewing as well as life: Sit tight if you hate something, as nothing is permanent." Armstrong also commented that the "sparkling" friendship development between O'Malley and Lexie "won her over". The following year, Monfette observed of O'Malley's lack of screen-time: "His growing interest in trauma surgery at the side of Owen leads to an interesting development in the finale, but the character is virtually sidelined this season." Carina MacKenzie of the Los Angeles Times said of the character's death: "The time-lapse episode was an interesting choice, and though we sped through six weeks of mourning in 2 hours, it didn't feel rushed to me. I'm not sure the show could have held my attention for another season of crippling sadness."

The Huffington Post Michael Pascua commented that O'Malley's funeral did not live up to his expectations, writing that it "wasn't as sad as [he] thought it would be". In 2006, Knight and the other cast of Grey's Anatomy were nominated for Outstanding Performance by an Ensemble in a Drama Series, at the 12th Screen Actors Guild Awards. Also in 2006, the cast won the award for Best Cast – Television Series at the 11th Satellite Awards. The cast won the award for Outstanding Performance by an Ensemble in a Drama Series at the 13th Screen Actors Guild Awards, and were nominated again the following year. Knight's performance in season 3 earned him a nomination for Outstanding Supporting Actor in a Drama Series at the 59th Primetime Emmy Awards.

References 
Specific

General

External links 

Fictional characters from Seattle
Fictional surgeons
Grey's Anatomy characters
Male characters in television

mk:Список на ликови од Вовед во анатомија#Џорџ О‘Мали